Victor Joseph Katz (born 31 December 1942, Philadelphia)  is an American mathematician, historian of mathematics, and teacher known for using the history of mathematics in teaching mathematics.

Biography
Katz received in 1963 from Princeton University a bachelor's degree and in 1968  from Brandeis University a Ph.D. in mathematics under Maurice Auslander with thesis The Brauer group of a regular local ring. He became at Federal City College an assistant professor and then in 1973 an associate professor and, after the merger of Federal City College into the University of the District of Columbia in 1977, a full professor there in 1980. He retired there as professor emeritus in 2005.

As a mathematician Katz specializes in algebra, but he is mainly known for his work on the history of mathematics and its uses in teaching. He wrote a textbook History of Mathematics: An Introduction (1993), for which he won in 1995 the Watson Davis and Helen Miles Davis Prize. He organized workshops and congresses for the Mathematical Association of America (MAA) and the National Council of Teachers of Mathematics. The MAA published a collection of teaching materials by Katz as a compact disk with the title Historical Modules for the Teaching and Learning of Mathematics. With Frank Swetz, he was a founding editor of a free online journal on the history of mathematics under the aegis of the MAA; the journal is called Convergence: Where Mathematics, History, and Teaching Interact. In the journal Convergence, Katz and Swetz published a series Mathematical Treasures. For a study of the possibilities for using mathematical history in schools, Katz received a grant from the National Science Foundation.

Personal 
He has been married since 1969 to Phyllis Katz (née Friedman), a science educator who developed and directed the U.S. national nonprofit organization Hands On Science Outreach, Inc. (HOSO). The couple have three children.

Selected publications

As author
History of Mathematics: An Introduction, New York: Harper Collins, 1993, 3rd edition Pearson 2008 (a shortened edition was published in 2003 by Pearson)
with Karen Hunger Parshall: Taming the Unknown: A History of Algebra from Antiquity to the Early Twentieth Century, Princeton University Press 2014
with John B. Fraleigh: A first course in abstract algebra, Addison-Wesley 2003

As editor
The Mathematics of Egypt, Mesopotamia, China, India and Islam: A Sourcebook, Princeton University Press 2007
with Bengt Johansson, Frank Swetz, Otto Bekken, John Fauvel: Learn from the Masters, MAA 1994 (contribution by Katz: Historical ideas in teaching linear algebra, Napier's logarithms adapted for today's classroom)
Using History to Teach Mathematics: An International Perspective, MAA 2000, MAA Notes (No. 51)
with Marlow Anderson, Robin Wilson: Sherlock Holmes in Babylon and other Tales of Mathematical History, (collection of reprints from the journal Mathematics Magazine of MAA; contribution by Katz: Ideas of calculus in Islam and India), MAA 2004
with Marlow Anderson, Robin Wilson: Who gave you the epsilon? and other tales of mathematical history, MAA 2009 (continuation of the collection of essays on the history of mathematics from MAA journal; contribution by Katz: The history of Stokes' theorem)
with Constantinos Tzanakis: Recent Developments on Introducing a Historical Dimension in Mathematics Education, MAA 2011

References

External links
Biography from the MAA

1942 births
Living people
20th-century American mathematicians
21st-century American mathematicians
American historians of mathematics
Princeton University alumni
Brandeis University alumni
University of the District of Columbia faculty